Kathanakuthuhalam or kathanakuthoohalam, also known as kathanakuthuhala is a raga in Carnatic music. Patnam Subramania Iyer is credited with inventing this raga. The famous kriti Raghuvamsha Sudhambudhi written by him is in this raga.

Structure 
Its ārohaṇa-avarohaṇa structure (ascending and descending scale) is as follows (see swaras in Carnatic music for details on below notation and terms):
 arohana: 
 avarohana:

References 

Janya ragas
Carnatic music